Jonathan William Lipnicki is an American actor who is known for his roles as a child actor.  He has appeared in films such as Jerry Maguire (1996), Stuart Little (1999) and its 2002 sequel Stuart Little 2, The Little Vampire (2000), Like Mike (2002), and Broil (2020). He also starred in the television series Dawson's Creek on The WB and Meego on CBS.

Early life
Jonathan William Lipnicki was born on October 22, 1990, in Westlake Village, California, to Joseph Lipnicki and Rhonda Rosen. He has an older sister, Alexis. His family is Jewish.

He was educated at Agoura High School, a public secondary school in the city of Agoura Hills in Los Angeles County, California.

Career
Lipnicki played the son of a single parent in his film debut Jerry Maguire. He subsequently appeared on The Single Guy, The Jeff Foxworthy Show as well as episodes of Dawson's Creek and the 1997 sitcom, Meego. He played the family son in Stuart Little and its sequel Stuart Little 2.

He also played the lead, Tony Thompson, in the 2000 film, The Little Vampire and co-starred with hip-hop rapper Bow Wow in the 2002 sports film, Like Mike, which was released two weeks before Stuart Little 2. The latter films did relatively well in theaters, and Lipnicki has become known among preteen audiences, although he has never appeared in a widely released film since, focusing mostly on independent films.

Lipnicki has also appeared in the season preview of Jamie Kennedy's Blowin' Up and When Zachary Beaver Came to Town.

He appeared on the comedy Motherlover on the YOMYOMF Network. Lipnicki currently trains in mixed martial arts styles, but when asked whether he planned to ever fight professionally, he replied, "I've been pretty busy filming and I would need to put off a certain amount of time to really train for a fight and be in amazing cardio shape and really work on my striking more. I'm not saying no and I'm not saying yes."

Lipnicki completed lead roles in the horror-thriller motion picture Broil, produced by the team behind It Follows, and the comedy-drama motion picture Pooling To Paradise opposite Taryn Manning and Jordan Carlos. He also guest-starred in Antoine Fuqua's and Philip Noyce's The Resident.

In 2022, it was announced to the public that Lipnicki will be starring in the horror film Camp Pleasant Lake as the character Jasper Meadows.

Philanthropy
Lipnicki has been a speaker for the Breast Cancer Research Foundation and is actively involved with the Juvenile Diabetes Research Foundation, the Starlight Children Foundation and the NBA's Read to Achieve program. In 2001, the Juvenile Diabetes Research Foundation named Lipnicki one of its "Heroes of 2001" at the age of ten, for his work with the organization.

Additionally, Lipnicki has been an international spokesperson for Pediatric Chiropractic and Kids Day America/International, and works with animal rights groups such as Pets and their Stars and the Nutz for Mutts group.

Filmography

Awards and honors

References

External links 
 
 

1990 births
Male actors from California
American male child actors
American male film actors
American male television actors
American philanthropists
Jewish American male actors
Living people
Male actors from Greater Los Angeles
People from Thousand Oaks, California
20th-century American male actors
21st-century American male actors
People from Westlake Village, California
21st-century American Jews